QV or Qv or q.v. may stand for:

 Quod vide (Latin for "for which see"), in cross-references and citations

Places
 Valley of the Queens, whose tombs are given the prefix "QV"
 Quaker Valley School District, a school district centered in Sewickley, Pennsylvania, United States
 Queen Victoria Village, a precinct in the central business district of Melbourne, Australia

Vehicles and transportation
 Lao Airlines (IATA code QV)
 MS Queen Victoria, a cruise ship operated by Cunard Line
 QV, meaning "4-valve" (quad valve), a type of multi-valve
 Alfa Romeo Quadrifoglio (Verde), a symbol of Alfa Romeo racing cars and higher trim street cars

Other uses
 ATCvet code QV Various, a section of the Anatomical Therapeutic Chemical Classification System for veterinary medicinal products
 Queen Victoria, a queen of the United Kingdom
 Quidi Vidi Brewing Company, or their QV Lager
 quod vide, Latin for "which see"; List of Latin abbreviations, List of Latin phrases (full)

See also

 
 VQ (disambiguation)
 V (disambiguation)
 Q (disambiguation)